Shakhta is a rural locality (a settlement) in Kizel Urban okrug, Perm Krai, Russia. The population was 1,109 as of 2010. There are 49 streets.

Geography 
Shakhta is located 6 km north of Kizel (the district's administrative centre) by road. Kizel is the nearest rural locality.

References 

Rural localities in Perm Krai